Simeticone (INN), also known as simethicone (USAN), is an anti-foaming agent used to reduce bloating, discomfort or pain caused by excessive gas.

Medical uses

Simeticone is used to relieve the symptoms of excessive gas in the gastrointestinal tract, namely bloating, burping, and flatulence. While there is a lack of conclusive evidence that simeticone is effective for this use, ⁣ studies have shown that it can relieve symptoms of functional dyspepsia and functional bloating.

It has not been fully established that simeticone is useful to treat colic in babies, and it is not recommended for this purpose.  A study in the United Kingdom reported that according to parental perception simeticone helped infant colic in some cases.

Simeticone can also be used for suspected postoperative abdominal discomfort in infants.

Side effects
Simeticone does not have any serious side effects. Two uncommon side effects (occurring in 1 in 100 to 1 in 1,000 patients) are constipation and nausea.

Pharmacology
Simeticone is a non-systemic surfactant which decreases the surface tension of gas bubbles in the GI tract. This allows gas bubbles to leave the GI tract as flatulence or belching. Simeticone does not reduce or prevent the formation of gas. Its effectiveness has been shown in several in vitro studies.

Chemistry
Simethicone is a mixture of dimethicone and silicon dioxide.

Names
The INN name is "simeticone", which was added to the INN recommended list in 1999.

Simeticone is marketed under many brand names and in many combination drugs; it is also marketed as a veterinary drug.

Brand names include A.F., Acid Off, Aero Red, Aero-OM, Aero-Sim, Aerocol, Aerox, Aesim, Aflat, Air-X, Anaflat, Antiflat, Baby Rest, Bicarsim, Bicarsim Forte, Blow-X, Bobotic, Bobotik, Carbogasol, Colic E, Colin, Cuplaton, Degas, Dentinox, Dermatix, Digesta, Dimetikon Meda, Disflatyl, Disolgas, Elugan N, Elzym, Endo-Paractol, Enterosilicona, Espaven Antigas, Espumisan, Espumisan L, Flacol, Flapex, Flatidyl, Flatoril, Flatulex, Flucolic, Gas X, Gas-X, Gaselab, Gaseoflat, Gaseoflatex, Gaseophar, Gaseoplus, Gaseovet, Gaservol, Gasimetin, Gasnil, Gasofilm, Gastrex, Gastrosen, Gazim X, Gazix, Geludrox-HS, Genasyme, Ilio-Funkton, Imogas, Imogaze, Imonogas, Infacalm, Infacol, Infacolic, Lefax, Lefaxin, Lefoam, Logastin, Luftal, Maxi Flat, Meteosim, Metiorisan, Metsil, Mylanta, Mylicon, Mylicongas, Mylom, Mymus, Nanog, Neodrop, Neogasol, Neolanta, Orocure, Ovol, Pedicon, Phazin, Phazyme, Restime, Rugby Gas Relief, Sab Simplex, Salinal, Semecon, Semeth, Sicongast, Siflat, Silbione, Siligas, Silipin, Sim, Simcone, Simecon, Simecrin, Simedill, Simegut, Simet, Simethicon, Simethicone, Simetic, Simeticon, Simeticona, Simeticone, Siméticone, Simeticonum, Simetigast, Simflat, Simicol, Simicon, Wilcon, Wind-eze and WindSetlers.

It is also marketed as a combination drug:
 with algeldrate as Kestomatine
 with aluminum or magnesium salts and in some cases both, as Alamag Plus, Almacone, Alposim, Aluphagel, Alutop, Amico-L Andursil, Axcel Eviline, Boots Wind Relief, Di-Gel, Diovol Plus, Diovol Plus AF, Gas Ban DS, Hydrosil, Iosopan Plus, Kremil, Kremil-S, Maalox Plus, Mi-Acid, Mygel, Mylagen, Polysilane Delalande, Rumibex and Trial AG
 with alverine as Avarin, Meteospasmyl, Nady-Spasmyl
 with barium sulfate as Bario Dif
 with bismuth as Gastop
 with calcium carbonate as Flamints, Gaseoflatex Plus, Malugel, Titralac Plus
 with activated charcoal as Carbosylane, Clingest, Finigax. Flatuna
 with cinitapride as Rogastril Plus
 with clebopride as Flatoril 
 with dicycloverine as Cloact, Colicspam, Colimix, Colispas, Coliza-D, Cyclopam, Fri-Spas, Meftal Spas, Respas, Simcomine, Spasact, Spasmindon DPS
 with domperidone as Bigetric, Dom Simecon, Doprokin-S, Glomoti, Moperidona AF, Mutecium, Praxis
 with hydrotalcite as Altacide and Talsil Forte
 with homatropine as Aero-Sim Compuesto, Asestor, Factor AG, Sedotropina Flat
 with lactulose as Dinolak
 with levonorgestrel as Jaydess
 with loperamide as Eldoper Plus, Imodium Duo, Imolopesim, Loperamide HCl/Dimeticon, Loperuma, Lositala, Losiwuto, Regulane AF, Stoperan Plus, Toban F Plus
 with magaldrate as Aci Basic, Aci-Tip, Acicone-S, Acid-Farvet, Acifin, Amalset, Antiax, Asidrat, Assis, Avicid, Banacid-s, Buenox, Cremalon, Curecid, Digax, Digeril, Endcid, Gaseovet MS, Gastrine, Gastrogel, Gastroral, Gastrorapid, Magacid, Magal-D, Magalat, Magaldrato+Simeticona, Magaldrax, Maganta Plus, Magsilon, Marlox Plus, Megacil Plus, Megalrat Plus, Minicidez, Miopan Plus, Novelta, Oxecone-MS, Riopan Plus, Rolac Plus, Sedo Mag, Simagal, Simelgat Plus, Taimacon, Zymcon
 with metoclopramide as Anaflat Compuesto, Di-Aero OM, Digespar, Factorine, Pangastren
 with mosapride as M-Pride-MPS, Moxar, Moza MPS 
 with pancreatin as Anaflat Enzimático, Digenil, Digesflat, Enzym Lefax, Enzymet, Enzymin, fermento duodenal, Finigax Indigestion, Flaton, Flazymec, Gasflat, Gaszym, Gesdyp, Hazmolin, Komflat, MeteoZym, Pankreoflat, Tripanzym
 with papaverine as Espasmo Siligas
 with pinaverium as Alevian Duo, Pladuet, Planex
 with pipenzolate bromide as Cadinol, Gasorbol Gotas
 with phloroglucinol as Meteoxane 
 with trimebutine as Eumotil-S, Eumotrix Plus, Libertrim SDP, Libertrim SII, Muvett S
 with urea as Hidribet.

It is also marketed as a veterinary drug under the brands Birp and Methysilox.

References 

Antiflatulents
Food additives
Silicon
Silicon dioxide
Digestive system
Silicones